BioUML is an open-source software platform for the analysis of data from omics sciences research and other advanced computational biology developed by scientists from the Institute of Systems Biology in Novosibirsk, Russia. The platform is freely available online and used in research labs for the discovery of disease origins and prevention.

Available versions 
The current release of BioUML is version 0.9.3 released in October 2010 and includes 3 versions.

BioUML Server offers access to data and analysis methods installed server-side for BioUML clients (workbench and web edition) over the Internet.
 
BioUML Workbench is a Java application that can work standalone or as "thick client" for the BioUML server edition.
 
BioUML Web Edition is a web browser based "thin client" for the BioUML server edition and provides most of the functionality of the BioUML workbench. It utilizes AJAX and HTML5 <canvas> technology for interactive data editing and visual modeling.

The platform has been developed continuously since 2003 and offers data analysis and visualizations for scientists involved in complex molecular biology research. The system allows for the formalized description of biological systems structure and function including tools required to make discoveries related to genomics, proteomics, transcriptomics and metabolomics. The BioUML platform is built in a modular architecture which has allowed for the relatively simple addition of new tools. This has allowed the integration of many 3rd party tools into the platform over the 7 years it has been available.

Application and usage 
BioUML was used as the main workbench for Cyclonet's integrated database on cell cycle regulation and carcinogenesis in 2007

Next-generation sequencing (NGS) and other high throughput methods create huge data sets (called "big data") in the region of 100 terabytes upwards. BioUML can disseminate, analyse  and produce visualizations and simulations, allows for parameter fitting and supports many other analysis techniques required to deal with large amounts of raw data. As research is typically shared between various institutions, the storage, delivery and sharing of 'big data' volumes has been a technical challenge. A typical genome data set might contain 500 terabytes of data which may need to be shared, often internationally using Internet2 technology. Proprietary data compression mechanisms have been created (by Valex LLC) for the NCBI Short Read Archive Project that allow for the delivery of raw research data at speeds of up to 40Gbit/s. To provide a full solution for such collaborative research, the makers of BioUML have developed a new hardware/software system in partnership with Valex LLC. This version of BioUML is called Bio datomics.

References

External links
 Official site

Computational biology